Stockton is a borough in Hunterdon County, in the U.S. state of New Jersey.  The borough sits on the Delaware River at the western end of Amwell Valley. As of the 2020 United States census, the borough's population was 495, a decrease of 43 (−8.0%) from the 2010 census count of 538, which in turn reflected a decline of 22 (−3.9%) from the 560 counted in the 2000 census.

Stockton was incorporated as a borough by an act of the New Jersey Legislature on April 14, 1898, from portions of Delaware Township.

History
Stockton is located along the Delaware River north of Lambertville. The community was first known as Reading Ferry and later as Howell's Ferry. The name was changed to Centre Bridge Station to match the name of the post office and hamlet on the Pennsylvania side of the river. The name became Stockton with the creation of a railroad station and a local post office in 1851. The community was named in honor of U.S. Senator Robert Field Stockton, who was instrumental in the creation of the Delaware and Raritan Canal. Stockton soon began to develop as an industrious town with mills and quarries sprouting in the area. In 1852 the Belvidere Delaware Railroad reached town and accelerated its prosperity. The Borough was incorporated in 1898, having been separated from Delaware Township.

Historic locations and sightseeing
The Stockton Inn (formerly known as Colligan's Stockton Inn) was established in 1710. The inn's Dog & Deer Tavern first opened in 1796. The inn that was the inspiration for Richard Rodgers for his hit song "There's a Small Hotel" sung in the 1936 Broadway musical On Your Toes. First built as a private residence it is believed to have been converted to an inn around 1832.

The Delaware River Mill Society was formed to preserve and promote the buildings and site known as Prallsville Mills. John Prall Jr., became the owner of the site in 1794 and with his settlement the area became known as Prallsville.

The Delaware River Mill Society is a private non-profit organization responsible for the restoration, maintenance, and operation of the historic John Prall Jr. House and the Prallsville Mills Complex, which was listed on the National Register of Historic Places in 1973. The entire property became part of the D & R Canal State Park in 1973. In 1976 when the State of New Jersey was unable to fund the restoration of its newly acquired Prallsville Mills, local citizens formed the Delaware River Mill Society, to "restore, preserve, operate, maintain and interpret" the historic site.

Prallsville Mills has become a place of cultural and environmental events attracting widespread participation. Visitors can tour 10 historic buildings including an 1877 grist mill, a 1790 linseed oil mill, an 1850 saw mill and a 1900 grain silo. Concerts, art exhibitions, antique shows, holiday parties, school fund-raiser auctions, meetings, as well as private parties, are a source of income for restoration and maintenance of the site. The site currently includes artist Ty Hodanish's studio and gallery, known as The Art Colony, which is housed in the Linseed Mill. The Mill is also situated in the center of the Delaware River Scenic Byway.

Geography
According to the United States Census Bureau, the borough had a total area of 0.62 square miles (1.61 km2), including 0.55 square miles (1.41 km2) of land and 0.08 square miles (0.19 km2) of water (12.10%).

The borough borders Delaware Township in Hunterdon County and Solebury Township in Bucks County, Pennsylvania.

Prallsville is an unincorporated community located along the border with Delaware Township.

Demographics

2010 census

The Census Bureau's 2006–2010 American Community Survey showed that (in 2010 inflation-adjusted dollars) median household income was $58,750 (with a margin of error of +/− $19,736) and the median family income was $72,321 (+/− $19,152). Males had a median income of $61,250 (+/− $24,259) versus $42,273 (+/− $34,015) for females. The per capita income for the borough was $38,153 (+/− $7,749). About none of families and 5.4% of the population were below the poverty line, including none of those under age 18 and 1.8% of those age 65 or over.

2000 census
As of the 2000 United States census there were 560 people, 246 households, and 148 families residing in the borough. The population density was 1,026.5 people per square mile (393.1/km2). There were 258 housing units at an average density of 472.9 per square mile (181.1/km2). The racial makeup of the borough was 98.57% White, 0.89% Asian, and 0.54% from two or more races. Hispanic or Latino of any race were 0.54% of the population.

There were 246 households, out of which 28.5% had children under the age of 18 living with them, 50.4% were married couples living together, 6.5% had a female householder with no husband present, and 39.8% were non-families. 30.5% of all households were made up of individuals, and 11.0% had someone living alone who was 65 years of age or older. The average household size was 2.28 and the average family size was 2.94.

In the borough the population was spread out, with 21.3% under the age of 18, 4.3% from 18 to 24, 34.5% from 25 to 44, 25.2% from 45 to 64, and 14.8% who were 65 years of age or older. The median age was 41 years. For every 100 females, there were 87.9 males. For every 100 females age 18 and over, there were 85.3 males.

The median income for a household in the borough was $51,406, and the median income for a family was $65,000. Males had a median income of $42,083 versus $36,250 for females. The per capita income for the borough was $25,712. About 1.3% of families and 2.0% of the population were below the poverty line, including 1.7% of those under age 18 and 1.0% of those age 65 or over.

Government

Local government
Stockton is governed under the Borough form of New Jersey municipal government, which is used in 218 municipalities (of the 564) statewide, making it the most common government form in New Jersey. The governing body is comprised of the Mayor and the Borough Council, with all positions elected at-large on a partisan basis as part of the November general election. The Mayor is elected directly by the voters to a four-year term of office. The Borough Council is comprised of six members elected to serve three-year terms on a staggered basis, with two seats coming up for election each year in a three-year cycle. The Borough form of government used by Stockton is a "weak mayor / strong council" government in which council members act as the legislative body with the mayor presiding at meetings and voting only in the event of a tie. The mayor can veto ordinances subject to an override by a two-thirds majority vote of the council. The mayor makes committee and liaison assignments for council members, and most appointments are made by the mayor with the advice and consent of the council.

, the Mayor of Stockton Borough is Democrat Timothy J. Nemeth, whose term of office ends December 31, 2022. Members of the Borough Council are Rebecca Hendricks (D, 2023), Adam Juncosa (D, 2022), Kenneth Kozuhowski (R, 2024), Aaron Lipsen (D, 2024), Michael L. Mann (D, 2023) and Donald Vandegrift (R, 2022).

Democrat Neal Esposito died in office on October 23, 2014, and was reelected posthumously for a new three-year term in the November general election. In the same election, Timothy Nemeth was elected as mayor, creating a vacancy in his seat expiring in December 2016. Democrat Adam Juncosa and Republican Anthony A. Grecco were appointed to fill the council vacancies. In the November 2015 general election, both Juncosa and Grecco were elected to serve the balance of the terms of office.

Federal, state and county representation
Stockton is located in the 7th Congressional District and is part of New Jersey's 16th state legislative district. Prior to the 2011 reapportionment following the 2010 Census, Stockton had been in the 23rd state legislative district.

Politics
As of March 2011, there were a total of 396 registered voters in Stockton, of which 166 (41.9%) were registered as Democrats, 127 (32.1%) were registered as Republicans and 102 (25.8%) were registered as Unaffiliated. There was one voter registered to another party.

In the 2012 presidential election, Democrat Barack Obama received 58.2% of the vote (174 cast), ahead of Republican Mitt Romney with 40.1% (120 votes), and other candidates with 1.7% (5 votes), among the 300 ballots cast by the borough's 399 registered voters (1 ballot was spoiled), for a turnout of 75.2%. In the 2008 presidential election, Democrat Barack Obama received 59.3% of the vote (210 cast), ahead of Republican John McCain with 38.1% (135 votes) and other candidates with 1.4% (5 votes), among the 354 ballots cast by the borough's 405 registered voters, for a turnout of 87.4%. In the 2004 presidential election, Democrat John Kerry received 57.3% of the vote (200 ballots cast), outpolling Republican George W. Bush with 41.5% (145 votes) and other candidates with 1.0% (4 votes), among the 349 ballots cast by the borough's 412 registered voters, for a turnout percentage of 84.7.

In the 2013 gubernatorial election, Republican Chris Christie received 60.1% of the vote (131 cast), ahead of Democrat Barbara Buono with 37.2% (81 votes), and other candidates with 2.8% (6 votes), among the 221 ballots cast by the borough's 393 registered voters (3 ballots were spoiled), for a turnout of 56.2%. In the 2009 gubernatorial election, Republican Chris Christie received 45.7% of the vote (122 ballots cast), ahead of  Democrat Jon Corzine with 43.4% (116 votes), Independent Chris Daggett with 8.2% (22 votes) and other candidates with 1.9% (5 votes), among the 267 ballots cast by the borough's 398 registered voters, yielding a 67.1% turnout.

Education

Stockton is part of the South Hunterdon Regional School District, which serves students in pre-kindergarten through twelfth grade from Lambertville, Stockton and West Amwell Township. As of the 2018–19 school year, the district, comprised of three schools, had an enrollment of 925 students and 108.0 classroom teachers (on an FTE basis), for a student–teacher ratio of 8.6:1. Schools in the district (with 2018–19 enrollment data from the National Center for Education Statistics) are The 
Lambertville Public School with 225 students in grades Pre-K–6, 
West Amwell School with 224 students in grades K–6 and 
South Hunterdon Regional High School with 458 students in grades 7–12.

Historically, Stockton had its own school district, the Stockton Borough School District, serving students in grades K–6. The district's sole school building, the District No. 98 Schoolhouse, had been in use since 1872. In a special election held in September 2013, voters from Lambertville, Stockton and West Amwell Township passed referendums to dissolve the South Hunterdon Regional High School District and to combine the three existing school districts from each municipality (Lambertville City School District, Stockton Borough School District and West Amwell Township School District), with majorities in each community passing both ballot items. A single combined regional district was created, serving students in grades Pre-K–12, in which property taxes are levied under a formula in which 57% is based on property values and 43% on the number of students. The executive county superintendent appointed an interim board of education for the new regional district, which was responsible for implementing the merger. The Stockton school was closed after the 2017–2018 school year and the elementary students were sent to Lambertville and West Amwell schools.

Eighth grade students from all of Hunterdon County are eligible to apply to attend the high school programs offered by the Hunterdon County Vocational School District, a county-wide vocational school district that offers career and technical education at its campuses in Raritan Township and at programs sited at local high schools, with no tuition charged to students for attendance.

Transportation

Route 29 and County Route 523 are the most significant highways passing through Stockton.

The Centre Bridge-Stockton Bridge is a toll-free bridge stretching  over the Delaware River that is owned and operated by the Delaware River Joint Toll Bridge Commission, connecting Pennsylvania Route 32 and Pennsylvania Route 263 in Solebury Township, Pennsylvania to New Jersey Route 29 in Stockton. The original bridge, constructed at the site formerly known as Reading's Ferry, was opened to traffic in the spring of 1814. The covered bridge was destroyed in a flood on January 8, 1841, striking the Lambertville Bridge on its way down the Delaware, as part of a flood that severely damaged every bridge between Easton, Pennsylvania and Trenton.

Notable people

People who were born in, residents of, or otherwise closely associated with Stockton include:

 Anne Elstner (1899–1981), actress who played the title role on the radio soap opera Stella Dallas during its entire run, from 1937–1955
 Chet Huntley (1911–1974), television newscaster, best known for co-anchoring NBC's evening news program, the Huntley-Brinkley Report, for 14 years beginning in 1956
 JP Miller (1919–2001), writer of teleplays during the Golden Age of Television
 Carolyn Rovee-Collier (1942–2014), pioneer and expert in cognitive development

References

External links

 Official website
 Hunterdon County web page for Stockton Borough
 South Hunterdon Regional School District
 
 School Data for the South Hunterdon Regional School District, National Center for Education Statistics
 Centre Bridge-Stockton article at the Delaware River Joint Toll Bridge Commission website
 An article about Stockton Borough's history at the Hunterdon County website
 Delaware River Mill Society's webpage for the Prallsville Mills complex
 Hunterdon Land Trust Alliance

 
1898 establishments in New Jersey
Borough form of New Jersey government
Boroughs in Hunterdon County, New Jersey
Populated places established in 1898
New Jersey populated places on the Delaware River